Paracles laguerrei is a moth of the subfamily Arctiinae first described by Hervé de Toulgoët in 2000. It is found in Bolivia.

References

Moths described in 2000
Paracles